Mahender Singh Gurjar is the Secretary Of Rajasthan Pradesh Congress Committee and Ex Member of the Legislative Assembly from Nasirabad in Ajmer district, Rajasthan, India.

References

Living people
Rajasthani politicians
Year of birth missing (living people)
Indian National Congress politicians from Rajasthan